Live Trucker is a live album by Kid Rock and Twisted Brown Trucker (credited as The Twisted Brown Trucker Band). Released on February 28, 2006, the album comprises songs from Kid Rock's homestands of Clarkston (on September 1, 2000, and August 26 through August 28, 2004) and The Palace at Auburn Hills (March 26, 2004). The album contained the last two performances of Joe C. on "Devil Without a Cause" and "Early Mornin' Stoned Pimp" as well as Gretchen Wilson dueting on "Picture". Other highlights included "Only God Knows Why", the medley of "Somebody's Gotta Feel This" and "Fist of Rage," bridged together by Led Zeppelin's "Whole Lotta Love".

"Cowboy" has the Dukes of Hazzard's theme song "Good Ol' Boys" removed from it. Likewise with "Devil Without a Cause" as AC/DC's "Back in Black" was removed from the first chorus.

"You Never Met a Motherfucker Quite Like Me" includes a verse of Lynyrd Skynyrd's "Free Bird" in the middle of the song. The album's final track is a rehearsal track from St. Louis 2004 called "Outstanding," a soul/funk cover originally done by The Gap Band.

The cover of the album is in the same style as the Bob Seger & The Silver Bullet Band album Live Bullet.

The album has sold just over 596,000 copies but the RIAA has yet to certify the album gold.

Track listing

Credits 

Kid Rock-Vocals, Guitar, Acoustic Guitar, Piano, Drums, Percussion
Kenny Olson-Lead Guitar
Jason Krause-Metal Guitar
Aaron Julison-Bass Guitar
Mike Bradford-Bass Guitar on tracks 5 and 10
Smith Curry-Dobro, Lap Steel Guitar, Slide Guitar
Jimmie Bones-Piano, Keyboards, Organ, Wurlitzer, Harp
Stephanie Eulinberg-Drums, Percussion, Vocals
Paradime -Turntables, Vocals
Uncle Kracker -Turntables, Vocals on tracks 5 and 10
Joe C - Vocals on tracks 5 and 10
Gretchen Wilson -Vocals on track 7
Lauren Creamer-Background Vocals
Karen Newman-Background Vocals

Kid Rock albums
2006 live albums
Atlantic Records live albums